Tinkle is an Indian fortnightly magazine for children in English, published from Mumbai. Originally owned by the India Book House, the Tinkle brand was acquired by ACK (Amar Chitra Katha) Media in 2007. The magazine contains comics, stories, puzzles, quizzes, contests and other features targeted at school children, although its readership includes many adults as well. It is published in English and syndicated in many Indian languages like Hindi, Bengali, and Malayalam.

The magazine was published at a monthly frequency until July 2016 when Tinkle announced its first fortnightly issue.

The first issue of Tinkle was released in November 1980. The magazine carries comics, stories and regular columns of interest to school children. Tinkle enjoys great popularity in India — , Tinkle had a circulation of 3 lakh copies per issue. It has been an integral part of growing up in India in the last two decades and characters like Suppandi and Shikari Shambu that were created in the early years of the magazine have nationwide recognition among all age groups. Readers send more than 200 letters with stories and other features to be considered for printing in the magazine. The wholesome combination of educational and entertainment that defines Tinkle has many celebrity fans in India, including the former Prime Minister of India, Atal Bihari Vajpayee. The official website of Tinkle contains puzzles and games.

Background
Anant Pai, the founding editor of the magazine, is known to his readers as Uncle Pai. The idea behind starting a comic book series devoted to Indian culture and history came to Pai from a quiz contest aired on Doordarshan in February 1967, in which participants could easily answer questions pertaining to Greek mythology, but were unable to reply to the question "In the Ramayana, who was Rama's mother?"

Pai left his job at Times of India, and started ACK (Amar Chitra Katha) the same year, with the help of late G.L. Mirchandani of IBH, (who also took charge as the command of Tinkle late when it was formed), when most other publishers had rejected the concept. Later, he took on the role of writer, editor and publisher. The series went on to become a publishing milestone for the Indian comic book scene, selling over 90 million copies of about 440 titles (as per last count until the end of 2008). He has also launched the popular series.

In June 2018, Tinkle Comics reprinted the Original Series in three volumes, with Tinkle stories and features from issue #1 to #18, originally published between December 1980 and April 1982.

Rajani Thindiath took over as editor-in-chief in 2010 and ran the magazine for a decade before moving on from the role in January 2021. During her tenure as editor, she created two brand new series for Tinkle. The first was SuperWeirdoes, a series about a set of teenagers with superweird powers, The series encouraged readers to embrace their uniqueness. The second series she created was YogYodhas, centered on two siblings, Bir and Bala, who are the latest in a long line of yogic warriors who can manifest spirit creatures called praanis. These praanis come to their aid in the YogYodhas' fight against evil. Rajani was also responsible for opening up different genres within Tinkle; she launched Tinkle superheroes like WingStar and the aforementioned SuperWeirdoes, introduced horror comedy for the first time in the form of Billy the Vampire (and later, Buchki and the Booligans) and created space for a boarding school series as well called NOIS!

Popular comics
Apart from one-off stories, Tinkle also has regular characters that appear in stand-alone fashion. Some of these characters are:

Currently on Tinkle
Kalia the Crow (Now known as ‘Big Baan’): A friendly crow living in a forest known as 'Big Baan', Kalia is the saviour of each and every small animal in the forest. With his sharp beak, sharp brains, and his friends Babloo the bear and Danti the Elephant, his enemies Chamataka the wily jackal and Doob-Doob the stupid crocodile are always outwitted of their plans to catch the rabbits Keechu and Meechu, the deer Shonar, and other small animals. The title was changed to 'Big Baan' in 2019 and features stories focusing less on Kalia and more on the other characters in the forest. (Creator: Luis Fernandes; Artists: Archana Amberkar [current], C.D. Rane, Prasad Iyer, Pradeep Sathe, Ram Waeerkar, Ashok Dongre, Ramanand Bhagat)
Defective Detectives: Consists of two friends, Rahul and Ravi, who are notorious for being wannabe detectives but unable to get even the simplest cases right, with the former's sister Samhita always proving to be better than the duo. (Artist: Abhijeet Kini)
SuperWeirdos: A girl named Aisha who is always trying to find her super powers and has. While she searches for her powers, she stumbles on other kids of her age who have amazing but weird powers. Superweirdos was stopped in 2019, but due to popular demand has been brought back. (Original Creator: Rajani Thindiath; Artist: Abhijeet Kini)
Mapui Kawlim a.k.a. Wingstar: A 13-year-old superhero girl from Aizawl, Mizoram. Her father, an inventor, made her rocket thrusters, iron fists, and reinforced robotic arms, with which she acquires super flight and super strength. (Creator: Sean D′mello; Co-creator Artist: Vineet Nair)
YogYodhas: Two Twins named Bir and Bala find birthmarks on their bodies that turn into animals (carcals, sharks, scorpions, unicorns, fireflies and a giant eagle). These animals are called Praanis and can be invoked using Yoga poses
NOIS: An Enid Blyton-inspired saga of boarding school adventures set at the Nilgiri Orchid International School, centered around fifth-graders Nadia (an overachiever who wants to get out of her sister's shadow) and Aadi (an over-imaginative young boy who dreams of being an actor).

Evergreen Stars
 Suppandi: Probably one of the most famous characters of the comics, amuses everyone with his stupidity. (Artists: Archana Amberkar [current], Sanjiv Waeerkar, Ram Waeerkar). Initially brought out as a village simpleton in 1983.
 Shikari Shambu: The faint hearted well renowned hunter, ends up being lauded for everything he did not achieve. Wild animals keep running into self made traps as he sleeps before them. (Creator: Subba Rao; Artists: Savio Mascarenhas [current], Vasant Halbe)
 Tantri the Mantri: An evil sinister mantri (minister) who tries to dethrone the king, Raja Hooja by his clever plans. However, the naive king who loves laddus trusts his minister more than anyone or anything in the world and never suspects him of any activity to kill him. Every episode sees Tantri hatching an elaborate and seemingly foolproof plan to eliminate Hooja, however for some reason or the other, all his plans backfire. In Tinkle Magazine No. 712, a bomb was thrown in Raja Hooja's palanquin and he was declared dead. Tantri was crowned king in Tinkle Magazine No. 714. Tantri's happiness was not long-lasted as Hooja's cousins were causing chaos in Tantri's mind and in Tinkle Magazine No. 730, Hooja was presumed alive, the cousins were in prison and Tantri again became a Mantri. Tantri again makes plans to usurp the throne of Hooja again. This plot seems to be based on the popular Iznogoud. (Artists: Prachi Killekar, Savio Mascarenhas, Anand Mande, Asit, Seema Mande, Ramanand Bhagat, Ajit Vasaikar, Ashok Dongre, Vineet Nair [current])
 Ina, Mina, Mynah, Mo: Four sisters who enjoy adventures. They have a father, Jagganath, (nicknamed Jaggu) who is a miser, and a mother, Bina.

Adaptions
Rather than being just comic book characters, some of the characters from Tinkle have been made into cartoons, movies and books.

The Suppandi series: a series of 8 books that have a selection of all the Suppandi tales found in Tinkle.
Suppandi, Suppandi!: a cartoon series featuring the popular Tinkle toon, Suppandi, features his acts of folly. This show currently airs on Cartoon Network and Pogo, often having return in the same channels.
Suppandi on YouTube: A series started in 2015, animated videos featuring Suppandi, Shikari Shambu and the Defective Detectives were released through 2016. Some of them included Coco as part of an advertising campaign with Kellogg's.
Shambu and the Man Eater: In November 2011, a short animated film featuring the popular Tinkle toon, Shikari Shambu, was released just before the premiere of the animated film of the popular Amar Chitra Katha series, The Sons of Ram. This movie features Shambu's adventures with a man-eating tiger.
The Butterfingers Series: A series of three books (as of 21 December 2015) features the clumsy acts of the popular Tinkle character, Amar Kishen aka Butterfingers, written by Khyrunnisa A. The series of three books (Howzaat Butterfingers!, Clean Bowled, Butterfingers!, Goal, Butterfingers!) revolves around Butterfingers and his friends, Eric, Kiran, and Minu, and their funny, comical high school life.

Discontinued
Dental Diaries: The de-fanged vampire Billy Drain goes on multiple quests to obtain a new pair of fangs, constantly supported and smothered by his overbearing mother Grilda, though they are thwarted at every step by the ambitious Myra Vamptop, who is both Billy's nemesis and object of desire.
Buchki and the Booligans: An 8-year-old girl named Buchki, along with her brother named Cyrus, encounters ghosts while staying with their grandmother, Didu, while their parents are in Japan. They befriend their great-great-grandfather's ghost.
Wai Knot: A kid from Bengaluru whose motto in life is "don't ask why, ask why not?". Brash, unapologetic and most of all incredibly strong-minded, Wai Knot, the new toon, stands out from Suppandi, Shikari Shambu, and other Tinkle toons. True to his name, Wai Knot always challenges those around him. He is inquisitive, be it his dad or his best friend Kia and often gets into trouble with his 'experiments'.
Pyarelal: A kind villager who lives in Hastipur with his wife Lajwanti. He's ready to help or find solutions to any problem. He is a big fan of the Circus and Gajjo Bajjo Sandow, the powerful wrestler. (Creator: Indira Ananthakrishnan; Artists: Archana Amberkar, Ram Waeerkar, Sanjiv Waeerkar)
Nasruddin Hodja: Hodja is a witty man who is disliked by many of his enemies. His rivals always try to put him in a spot, but Hodja turns the tables on them because of his true wit and cheeky ways, with the stories bearing a relationship to Birbal. (Illustrations: Ram Waeerkar).
Mopes and Purr: A detective cat-and-dog duo who is always on the run, solving cases. (Creator: Reena I Puri; Artist: Savio Mascarenhas)
Butterfingers: A clumsy boy named Amar who is chidingly called "Butterfingers" by his parents, friends and teachers. He is chided for his sloppiness and laziness, but is a happy-go-lucky character who also has a presence of mind and manages to save the day despite messing up trivial stuff. The comic, however, was stopped in 2014. (Creator: Khyrunissa A.; Artists: Abhijeet Kini)
 Anwar: A small boy of five who uses his wit and intelligence to get the better of every situation. (Illustrations: Savio Mascarenhas, formerly VB Halbe)
Raghu: An 8-year-old happy-go-lucky boy, who renders people speechless with his wit. (Illustrations: Savio Mascarenhas, Sanjiv Waeerkar and Ram Waeerkar)
Ramu and Shamu: They are very similar to Dennis the Menace in nature. These identical twins are about eight years of age and live in a middle-class home with their parents. They always embarrass or confuse their parents with their juvenile and innocent questions or acts. Their episodes are small but very cute and charming. (Creator: Anant Pai; Artists: Mohandas, Ajit Vasaikar)
 Kapish: This series is similar to Kalia the Crow. Kapish is a monkey who lives in the jungle of Kadu along with his friends Bundila the elephant calf, Baboocha the bear, Pintu the fawn, Motu the rabbit, Kashapu the tortoise and Panja the eagle. His arch-enemies include Peelu the tiger, Sigal the jackal, Kesha the lion and Dopaya the hunter. Kapish uses his magic tail, which can be extended, shrunk and narrowed at will, in order to save Pintu, Motu, Kashapu as well as the other smaller animals of the forest from the plans of Peelu, Sigal and Dopaya. (Creator: Anant Pai; Artists: Mohandas, Ajit Vasaikar)
 Little Raji: Raji is a young girl who lives in a middle-class home with her parents and elder brother Raju. She is a quick-witted girl who uses her presence of mind to resolve various problems. (Creator: Anant Pai; Artists: Sunita Kalewar)
 Anu Club: Anurag Sharma aka Uncle Anu, is a nuclear physicist who runs the weekly Anu Club, whose members include the neighbourhood kids such as Anand, Amar, Deepa, Vijay as well as the brother-sister duo of Bharat and Chitra. During the club meetings, Uncle Anu explains to the kids scientific concepts in a practical and fun manner. (Creator: Margie Sastry; Artists: Ramanand Bhagat, Souren Roy, Goutam Sen, Shyam Desai)
 Choru and Joru: Choru, a thief, always has his plans foiled due to the efforts of the police inspector Joru. (Creator: Prasad Iyer; Artists: Anand Mande, Ram Waeerkar)
 The Dumbbells: Nattoo, Dattoo and Motu are three friends whose antics cause chaos among everyone around them. (Creator: Prasad Iyer; Artists: Anand Mande)
 Mooshik: A three paneled silent comic of a cat chasing a mouse. The comics don't have any dialogue and are reminiscent of Tom and Jerry. (Creator: Subba Rao)

See also
Balarama
Champak

References

External links

 
 
 
 
 
 
  Tinkle celebrates -  Kids cheered as the 500th issue of Tinkle comics was released in a special edition—The Hindu

1980 comics debuts
1980 establishments in India
English-language magazines published in India
Children's magazines published in India
Indian comics
Monthly magazines published in India
Magazines established in 1980
Multilingual magazines